Sylvania is a neighborhood of Louisville, Kentucky located near Terry Road along Sylvania Road.

Geography

References

External links
"Sylvania: Embattled from the Start, Community Has Fashioned Its Character as One of Resilience" — Article by Linda Lyly of The Courier-Journal

Neighborhoods in Louisville, Kentucky